Expert Opinion on Drug Metabolism & Toxicology is a monthly peer-reviewed medical journal publishing review articles on ADME-Tox. It was established in 2005 and is published by Taylor and Francis. The editor-in-chief is Luis Valerio (Food and Drug Administration).

Abstracting and indexing 
The journal is abstracted and indexed in Index Medicus/MEDLINE/PubMed, Science Citation Index Expanded, Biochemistry & Biophysics Citation Index, and EMBASE/Excerpta Medica. According to the Journal Citation Reports, the journal has a 2014 impact factor of 2.831.

References

External links 

Pharmacology journals
English-language journals
Publications established in 2005
Expert Opinion journals
Monthly journals
Taylor & Francis academic journals